Arthur is a former provincial electoral division in the Canadian province of Manitoba.  It was created in 1903 and was eliminated by redistribution in 1989, when its territory was combined with that from the neighbouring Virden riding to create the new riding of Arthur-Virden.

The riding was located in the province's southwestern tip, and was primarily agrarian.  From 1953 until its abolition, it was a safe seat for the Progressive Conservative Party.

List of provincial representatives

Former provincial electoral districts of Manitoba
1903 establishments in Manitoba
1989 disestablishments in Manitoba